Ptychostomella is a genus of gastrotrichs belonging to the family Thaumastodermatidae.

The species of this genus are found in Europe, Japan.

Species

Species:

Ptychostomella bergensis 
Ptychostomella brachycephala 
Ptychostomella helana

References

Gastrotricha